The 2005 World Weightlifting Championships were held in  Al-Sadd Sports Centre, Doha, Qatar from November 9 to November 17.

Medal summary

Men

Women

Medal table
Ranking by Big (Total result) medals 

Ranking by all medals: Big (Total result) and Small (Snatch and Clean & Jerk)

Team ranking

Men

Women

Participating nations
281 competitors from 71 nations competed.

 (3)
 (1)
 (2)
 (6)
 (1)
 (4)
 (5)
 (3)
 (1)
 (9)
 (4)
 (5)
 (15)
 (6)
 (13)
 (2)
 (2)
 (4)
 (6)
 (1)
 (1)
 (4)
 (1)
 (4)
 (8)
 (7)
 (5)
 (4)
 (2)
 (1)
 (2)
 (1)
 (9)
 (5)
 (1)
 (1)
 (1)
 (2)
 (1)
 (1)
 (3)
 (6)
 (2)
 (2)
 (1)
 (3)
 (1)
 (1)
 (1)
 (1)
 (11)
 (1)
 (5)
 (7)
 (15)
 (1)
 (1)
 (4)
 (2)
 (5)
 (8)
 (1)
 (7)
 (2)
 (8)
 (2)
 (5)
 (13)
 (6)
 (1)
 (1)

References

Results (Sport 123)
Weightlifting World Championships Seniors Statistics 

 
World Weightlifting Championships
World Weightlifting Championships
International weightlifting competitions hosted by Qatar
Sports competitions in Doha
World Weightlifting Championships
21st century in Doha
November 2005 sports events in Asia